Olea paniculata, commonly known as the native olive, is a plant of the genus Olea and a relative of the olive. It grows natively in Pakistan and southwestern China (Yunnan) through tropical Asia to Australia (Queensland and New South Wales) and the Pacific islands of New Caledonia, Vanuatu and Lord Howe Island.

Description
The blue-black fruit are oval and measure 0.8–1.2 (0.3–0.5 in) cm long. They are ripe from May to September.

It resembles the introduced and weedy African olive Olea europaea subsp. cuspidata, but the latter lacks O. paniculatas small depressions between the main and secondary veins on the back of the leaf. The introduced species is found in disturbed areas such as roadsides and waterways.

Taxonomy
One of many species first described by Robert Brown in his 1810 work Prodromus Florae Novae Hollandiae, it still bears its original binomial name. Other common names include Australian olive, pigeonberry ash, maulwood, and clove berry'''. In Chinese, it is called 腺叶木犀榄. The specific name is derived from the Latin panicula "tuft", from the arrangement of flowers.

Distribution and habitatOlea paniculata'' is found from North East Queensland to the vicinity of the Hunter Region in New South Wales. In Australia it is found near watercourses in dry rainforests. Outside Australia it is found in  Yunnan province in southwestern China, where it occurs in sheltered wetter valleys  in altitude, as well as India, Indonesia, Kashmir, Malaysia, Nepal, New Guinea, Pakistan, and Sri Lanka. On Lord Howe Island it is widespread below around  elevation. It is also found on New Caledonia and Vanuatu.

Ecology
The fruit are consumed by the Australian king parrot, brown cuckoo-dove, topknot pigeon, rose-crowned fruit-dove, wompoo fruit-dove, white-headed pigeon, green catbird and regent bowerbird in Australia.

Uses
It is a fast pioneer species on sunny protected sites, but needs well drained soil for good growth. It is a butterfly host plant whose black fruit attracts birds. The fruit was traditionally eaten by Aboriginal Australians.

References

paniculata
Lamiales of Australia
Flora of Queensland
Trees of the Indian subcontinent
Trees of China
Trees of Thailand
Trees of Malesia
Trees of New Guinea
Trees of New Caledonia
Trees of Vanuatu
Flora of New South Wales
Flora of Lord Howe Island
Plants described in 1810
Bushfood